Paramigas is a genus of tree trapdoor spiders native to Madagascar. It was first described by Reginald Innes Pocock in 1895.

Species
, it contains eleven species:

Paramigas alluaudi (Simon, 1903)
Paramigas andasibe Raven, 2001
Paramigas goodmani Griswold & Ledford, 2001
Paramigas macrops Griswold & Ledford, 2001
Paramigas manakambus Griswold & Ledford, 2001
Paramigas milloti Griswold & Ledford, 2001
Paramigas oracle Griswold & Ledford, 2001
Paramigas pauliani (Dresco & Canard, 1975)
Paramigas pectinatus Griswold & Ledford, 2001
Paramigas perroti (Simon, 1891)
Paramigas rothorum Griswold & Ledford, 2001

References

Migidae
Mygalomorphae genera
Spiders of Madagascar